Robert Christopher Lasch (June 1, 1932 – February 14, 1994) was an American historian, moralist and social critic who was a history professor at the University of Rochester. He sought to use history to demonstrate what he saw as the pervasiveness with which major institutions, public and private, were eroding the competence and independence of families and communities. Lasch strove to create a historically informed social criticism that could teach Americans how to deal with rampant consumerism, proletarianization, and what he famously labeled "the culture of narcissism".

His books, including The New Radicalism in America (1965), Haven in a Heartless World (1977), The Culture of Narcissism (1979), The True and Only Heaven (1991), and The Revolt of the Elites and the Betrayal of Democracy (published posthumously in 1996) were widely discussed and reviewed. The Culture of Narcissism became a surprise best-seller and won the National Book Award in the category Current Interest (paperback).

Lasch was always a critic of modern liberalism and a historian of liberalism's discontents, but over time, his political perspective evolved dramatically. In the 1960s, he was a neo-Marxist and acerbic critic of Cold War liberalism. During the 1970s, he supported certain aspects of cultural conservatism with a left-leaning critique of capitalism, and drew on Freud-influenced critical theory to diagnose the ongoing deterioration that he perceived in American culture and politics. His writings are sometimes denounced by feminists and hailed by conservatives for his apparent defense of a traditional conception of family life.

He eventually concluded that an often unspoken, but pervasive, faith in "Progress" tended to make Americans resistant to many of his arguments. In his last major works he explored this theme in depth, suggesting that Americans had much to learn from the suppressed and misunderstood populist and artisan movements of the nineteenth and early twentieth centuries.

Biography
Born on June 1, 1932, in Omaha, Nebraska, Christopher Lasch came from a highly political family rooted in the left. His father, Robert Lasch, was a Rhodes Scholar and journalist who won a Pulitzer prize for editorials criticizing the Vietnam War while he was in St. Louis. His mother, Zora Lasch (née Schaupp), who held a philosophy doctorate, worked as a social worker and teacher.

Lasch was active in the arts and letters early, publishing a neighborhood newspaper while in grade school, and writing the fully orchestrated "Rumpelstiltskin, Opera in D Major" at the age of thirteen.

Career
Lasch earned a bachelor's degree in history from Harvard University, where he roomed with John Updike, and a master's degree in history and doctorate from Columbia University, where he worked with William Leuchtenburg. Richard Hofstadter was also a significant influence. He contributed a Foreword to later editions of Hofstadter's The American Political Tradition and an article on Hofstadter in the New York Review of Books in 1973. He taught at the University of Iowa and then was a professor of history at the University of Rochester from 1970 until his death from cancer in 1994. Lasch also took a conspicuous public role. Russell Jacoby acknowledged this in writing that "I do not think any other historian of his generation moved as forcefully into the public arena". In 1986 he appeared on Channel 4 television in discussion with Michael Ignatieff and Cornelius Castoriadis.

During the 1960s, Lasch identified as a socialist, but one who found influence not just in the writers of the time, such as C. Wright Mills, but also in earlier independent voices, such as Dwight Macdonald. Lasch became further influenced by writers of the Frankfurt School and the early New Left Review and felt that "Marxism seemed indispensable to me". During the 1970s, however, he became disenchanted with the Left's belief in progress—a theme treated later by his student David Noble—and increasingly identified this belief as the factor that explained the Left's failure to thrive despite the widespread discontent and conflict of the times. He was a professor of history at Northwestern University from 1966 to 1970.

At this point Lasch began to formulate what would become his signature style of social critique: a syncretic synthesis of Sigmund Freud and the strand of socially conservative thinking that remained deeply suspicious of capitalism and its effects on traditional institutions.

Besides Leuchtenburg, Hofstadter, and Freud, Lasch was especially influenced by Orestes Brownson, Henry George, Lewis Mumford, Jacques Ellul, Reinhold Niebuhr, and Philip Rieff. A notable group of graduate students worked with Lasch at the University of Rochester, Eugene Genovese, and, for a time, Herbert Gutman, including Leon Fink, Russell Jacoby, Bruce Levine, David Noble, Maurice Isserman, William Leach, Rochelle Gurstein, Kevin Mattson, and Catherine Tumber.

Personal
Lasch married Nellie Commager, daughter of historian Henry Steele Commager, in 1956. They had four children: Robert, Elizabeth, Catherine, and Christopher.

Death
After seemingly successful cancer surgery in 1992, Lasch was diagnosed with metastatic cancer in 1993. Upon learning that it was unlikely to significantly prolong his life, he refused chemotherapy, observing that it would rob him of the energy he needed to continue writing and teaching. To one persistent specialist, he wrote: "I despise the cowardly clinging to life, purely for the sake of life, that seems so deeply ingrained in the American temperament." He died at his home in Pittsford, New York on February 14, 1994, at age 61.

Ideas

The New Radicalism in America
Lasch's earliest argument, anticipated partly by Hofstadter's concern with the cycles of fragmentation among radical movements in the United States, was that American radicalism had at some point in the past become socially untenable. Members of "the Left" had abandoned their former commitments to economic justice and suspicion of power, to assume professionalized roles and to support commoditized lifestyles which hollowed out communities' self-sustaining ethics. His first major book, The New Radicalism in America: The Intellectual as a Social Type, published in 1965 (with a promotional blurb from Hofstadter), expressed those ideas in the form of a bracing critique of twentieth-century liberalism's efforts to accrue power and restructure society, while failing to follow up on the promise of the New Deal. Most of his books, even the more strictly historical ones, include such sharp criticism of the priorities of alleged "radicals" who represented merely extreme formations of a rapacious capitalist ethos.

His basic thesis about the family, which he first expressed in 1965 and explored for the rest of his career, was:

The Culture of Narcissism

Lasch's most famous work, The Culture of Narcissism: American Life in an Age of Diminishing Expectations (1979), sought to relate the hegemony of modern-day capitalism to an encroachment of a "therapeutic" mindset into social and family life similar to that already theorized by Philip Rieff. Lasch posited that social developments in the 20th century (e.g., World War II and the rise of consumer culture in the years following) gave rise to a narcissistic personality structure, in which individuals' fragile self-concepts had led, among other things, to a fear of commitment and lasting relationships (including religion), a dread of aging (i.e., the 1960s and 1970s "youth culture") and a boundless admiration for fame and celebrity (nurtured initially by the motion picture industry and furthered principally by television). He claimed, further, that this personality type conformed to structural changes in the world of work (e.g., the decline of agriculture and manufacturing in the USA and the emergence of the "information age"). With those developments, he charged, inevitably there arose a certain therapeutic sensibility (and thus dependence) that, inadvertently or not, undermined older notions of self-help and individual initiative. By the 1970s, even pleas for "individualism" were desperate and essentially ineffectual cries that expressed a deeper lack of meaningful individuality.

The True and Only Heaven

Most explicitly in The True and Only Heaven, Lasch developed a critique of social change among the middle classes in the USA, explaining and seeking to counteract the fall of elements of  "populism". He sought to rehabilitate this populist or producerist alternative tradition: "The tradition I am talking about ... tends to be skeptical of programs for the wholesale redemption of society ... It is very radically democratic and in that sense it clearly belongs on the Left. But on the other hand it has a good deal more respect for tradition than is common on the Left, and for religion too." And said that: "...any movement that offers any real hope for the future will have to find much of its moral inspiration in the plebeian radicalism of the past and more generally in the indictment of progress, large-scale production and bureaucracy that was drawn up by a long line of moralists whose perceptions were shaped by the producers' view of the world."

Critique of progressivism and libertarianism

By the 1980s, Lasch had poured scorn on the whole spectrum of contemporary mainstream American political thought, angering liberals with attacks on progressivism and feminism. He wrote that

Journalist Susan Faludi dubbed him explicitly anti-feminist for his criticism of the abortion rights movement and opposition to divorce. But Lasch viewed Ronald Reagan's conservatism as the antithesis of tradition and moral responsibility. Lasch was not generally sympathetic to the cause of what was then known as the New Right, particularly those elements of libertarianism most evident in its platform; he detested the encroachment of the capitalist marketplace into all aspects of American life.

Lasch rejected the dominant political constellation that emerged in the wake of the New Deal in which economic centralization and social tolerance formed the foundations of American liberal ideals, while also rebuking the diametrically opposed synthetic conservative ideology fashioned by William F. Buckley Jr. and Russell Kirk. Lasch was also critical and at times dismissive toward his closest contemporary kin in social philosophy, communitarianism as elaborated by Amitai Etzioni. Only populism satisfied Lasch's criteria of economic justice (not necessarily equality, but minimizing class-based difference), participatory democracy, strong social cohesion and moral rigor; yet populism had made major mistakes during the New Deal and increasingly been co-opted by its enemies and ignored by its friends. For instance, he praised the early work and thought of Martin Luther King Jr. as exemplary of American populism; yet in Lasch's view, King fell short of this radical vision by embracing in the last few years of his life an essentially bureaucratic solution to ongoing racial stratification.

He explained in one of his books The Minimal Self, "it goes without saying that sexual equality in itself remains an eminently desirable objective ...". In Women and the Common Life, Lasch clarified that urging women to abandon the household and forcing them into a position of economic dependence in the workplace, pointing out the importance of professional careers does not entail liberation, so long as these careers are governed by the requirements of corporate economy.

The Revolt of the Elites: And the Betrayal of Democracy

In his last months, he worked closely with his daughter Elisabeth to complete The Revolt of the Elites: And the Betrayal of Democracy, published in 1994, in which he "excoriated the new meritocratic class, a group that had achieved success through the upward-mobility of education and career and that increasingly came to be defined by rootlessness, cosmopolitanism, a thin sense of obligation, and diminishing reservoirs of patriotism," and "argued that this new class 'retained many of the vices of aristocracy without its virtues', lacking the sense of 'reciprocal obligation' that had been a feature of the old order."
 
Christopher Lasch analyzes the widening gap between the top and bottom of the social composition in the United States. For him, our epoch is determined by a social phenomenon: the revolt of the elites, in reference to The Revolt of the Masses (1929) of the Spanish philosopher José Ortega y Gasset. According to Lasch, the new elites, i.e. those who are in the top 20 percent in terms of income, through globalization which allows total mobility of capital, no longer live in the same world as their fellow-citizens. In this, they oppose the old bourgeoisie of the nineteenth and twentieth centuries, which was constrained by its spatial stability to a minimum of rooting and civic obligations.

Globalization, according to the historian, has turned elites into tourists in their own countries. The de-nationalization of society tends to produce a class who see themselves as "world citizens, but without accepting… any of the obligations that citizenship in a polity normally implies". Their ties to an international culture of work, leisure, information – make many of them deeply indifferent to the prospect of  national decline. Instead of financing public services and the public treasury, new elites are investing their money in improving their voluntary ghettos: private schools in their residential neighborhoods, private police, garbage collection systems. They have "withdrawn from common life".

Composed of those who control the international flows of capital and information, who preside over philanthropic foundations and institutions of higher education, they manage the instruments of cultural production and thus fix the terms of public debate. So, the political debate is limited mainly to the dominant classes and political ideologies lose all contact with the concerns of the ordinary citizen. The result of this is that no one has a likely solution to these problems and that there are furious ideological battles on related issues. However, they remain protected from the problems affecting the working classes: the decline of industrial activity, the resulting loss of employment, the decline of the middle class, increasing the number of the poor, the rising crime rate, growing drug trafficking, the urban crisis.

In addition, he finalized his intentions for the essays to be included in Women and the Common Life: Love, Marriage, and Feminism, which was published, with his daughter's introduction, in 1997.

Selected works

Books
 1962: The American Liberals and the Russian Revolution.
 1965: The New Radicalism in America 1889–1963: The Intellectual As a Social Type.
 1969: The Agony of the American Left.
 1973: The World of Nations.
 1977: Haven in a Heartless World: The Family Besieged.
 1979: The Culture of Narcissism: American Life in an Age of Diminishing Expectations.
 1984: The Minimal Self: Psychic Survival in Troubled Times.
 1991: The True and Only Heaven: Progress and Its Critics.
 1994: The Revolt of the Elites: And the Betrayal of Democracy, W. W. Norton & Company,  
 1997: Women and the Common Life: Love, Marriage, and Feminism.
 2002: Plain Style: A Guide to Written English.

Articles

 
 
 
 
 
 
 
 
 
 
  The Future of the Humanities
 
 
 
 
  The Politics of Anti-Realism
 
 
 
 
 
 
 
 
  Intellectuals
 
 
 
  Intellectuals.
  Symposium: Habits of The Heart.
 
 
 
 
 
 
 
 
 
 
 
 
 
 
 
 
 
 
 
 
  Interview.

See also
 Cultural narcissism
 Rhetoric of therapy

Notes

References

Further reading

 Anderson, Kenneth. "Heartless World Revisited: Christopher Lasch's Parting Polemic Against the New Class," The Good Society, Vol. 6, No. 1, Winter 1996.
 Bacevich, Andrew J.  World Affairs, May/June 2010.
 Bartee, Seth J. "Christopher Lasch, Conservative?," The University Bookman, Spring 2012.
 Beer. Jeremy. "On Christopher Lasch," Modern Age, Fall 2005, Vol. 47 Issue 4, pp. 330–343
 Beer. Jeremy. "The Radical Lasch," The American Conservative, March 27, 2007.
 Birnbaum, Norman. "Gratitude and Forbearance: On Christopher Lasch," The Nation, October 3, 2011.
 Bratt, James D. "The Legacy of Christopher Lasch," Books & Culture, 2012.
 Brown, David S. "Christopher Lasch, Populist Prophet," The American Conservative, August 12, 2010.
 Deneen, Patrick J. "Christopher Lasch and the Limits of Hope," First Things, December 2004.
 Elshtain, Jean Bethke. "The Life and Work of Christopher Lasch: An American Story," Salmagundi, No. 106/107, Spring - Summer 1995.
 Fisher, Berenice M. "The Wise Old Men and the New Women: Christopher Lasch Besieged," History of Education Quarterly, Vol. 19, No. 1, Women's Influence on Education, Spring, 1979.
 Flores, Juan. "Reinstating Popular Culture: Responses to Christopher Lasch," Social Text, No. 12, Autumn, 1985.
 Hartman, Andrew. "Christopher Lasch: Critic of Liberalism, Historian of Its Discontents," Rethinking History, Dec 2009, Vol. 13 Issue 4, pp. 499–519
 Kimball, Roger. "The Disaffected Populist: Christopher Lasch on Progress," The New Criterion, March 1991.
 Kimball, Roger. "Christopher Lasch vs. the Elites," The New Criterion, April 1995.
 Mattson, Kevin. "The Historian As a Social Critic: Christopher Lasch and the Uses of History," History Teacher, May 2003, Vol. 36 Issue 3, pp. 375–96
 Mattson, Kevin. "Christopher Lasch and the Possibilities of Chastened Liberalism," Polity, Vol. 36, No. 3, Apr. 2004.
 Miller, Eric. Hope in a Scattering Time: A Life of Christopher Lasch , William B. Eerdmans Publishing, 2010.
 Nieli, Russell. "Social Conservatives of the Left: James Lincoln Collier, Christopher Lasch, and Daniel Bell,"  The Political Science Reviewer, Vol. XXII, 1993.
 Parsons, Adam. "Christopher Lasch, Radical Orthodoxy & the Modern Collapse of the Self,"  New Oxford Review, November 2008.
 Rosen, Christine. "The Overpraised American: Christopher Lasch's The Culture of Narcissism Revisited," Policy Review, Nº. 133, October 1, 2005.
 Salyer, Jerry D. "Christopher Lasch: One of Bannon's Favorite Authors," Crisis Magazine September 19, 2017.
 Shapiro, Herbert. "Lasch on Radicalism: The Problem of Lincoln Steffens," The Pacific Northwest Quarterly, Vol. 60, No. 1, Jan. 1969.
 Scialabba, George. "'No, in thunder!': Christopher Lasch and the Spirit of the Age," Agni, No. 34, 1991.
 Seaton, James. "The Gift of Christopher Lasch," First Things, Vol. XLV, August/September 1994.
 Siegel, Fred. "The Agony of Christopher Lasch," Reviews in American History, Vol. 8, No. 3, Sep. 1980.
 Westbrook, Robert B. "Christopher Lasch, The New Radicalism, and the Vocation of Intellectuals," Reviews in American History, Volume 23, Number 1, March 1995.

External links

 Obituary: The New York Times, The Independent.
 Writings of Christopher Lasch: The New York Review of Books
 The Pursuit of Progress, 1991 interview on Richard Heffner's The Open Mind: on the Daily Motion; on Youtube.
 The Writings of Christopher Lasch: A Bibliography-in-Progress / Compiled by Robert Cummings (last updated 2003)
 On the Moral Vision of Democracy: A Conversation with Christopher Lasch
 Voices Against Progress: What I Learned from Genovese, Lasch, and Bradford, by Paul Gottfried

1932 births
1994 deaths
20th-century American historians
20th-century American male writers
20th-century American non-fiction writers
Narcissism writers
Columbia Graduate School of Arts and Sciences alumni
Deaths from cancer in New York (state)
Freudo-Marxism
Harvard College alumni
National Book Award winners
Northwestern University faculty
People from Pittsford, New York
Psychology writers
University of Rochester faculty
Writers from Omaha, Nebraska